Carbondale Township may refer to the following townships in the United States:

 Carbondale Township, Jackson County, Illinois
 Carbondale Township, Lackawanna County, Pennsylvania